Useless Loop   is a town located on the Heirisson Prong on Denham Sound in the Southern Region of UNESCO World Heritage Site Shark Bay, Western Australia. The town of Denham is on the opposite shore of the sound and the more famous Monkey Mia near Denham.  Useless Loop is a closed company town, with 70 employees and their families servicing the Solar Salt Operation Shark Bay which was established in 1962 by Shark Bay Resources Ltd.   A joint venture was formed in 1973 with Mitsui & Co. Ltd which acquired full ownership in 2005, incorporated as Shark Bay Salt Pty Ltd.  In 2015, Useless Loop's salt exports were running at a rate of 1.4 million tonnes per annum.

Useless Loop received the 2001 Banksia Award for Community Group Achievement and the 2001 Banksia Gold Award for its initiation of the Heirisson Prong Project in 1989 to protect and relocate the burrowing bettong, western barred bandicoot, and greater stick-nest rat, all endangered Australian mammals.

The first half of Useless Loop's unusual name was bestowed upon it by French explorer Henri-Louis de Saulces de Freycinet, brother of the more famous Louis de Freycinet, during the Baudin expedition to Australia. Henri-Louis dubbed the area "" ("Useless Harbour"), because he believed the inviting harbour to be entirely blocked by a sandbar.

References

Further reading
 Western Australia. Environmental Protection Authority.(1999) Construction of additional crystalliser ponds, Useless Loop, Shark Bay, Shark Bay Salt Joint Venture : report and recommendations of the Environmental Protection Authority. Perth, W.A. : Environmental Protection Authority. Bulletin.Environmental Protection Authority, 1030-0120; 934

Shire of Shark Bay